The women's 3 metre springboard competition of the diving events at the 2019 Pan American Games was held on 4–5 August at the Aquatics Centre in Lima, Peru.

Schedule

Results
Green denotes finalists

References 

Diving at the 2019 Pan American Games